The Black Lauter is the left hand source of the river Lauter.  It rises in Schlatstall from the Lauterquelle well and the Golden hole. Near Lenningen it joins the White Lauter, forming the Lauter.

Wells 
At the mouth of the Kohlhau Valley, where it joins the Lenningen valley, lies the village of Schlatstall, which is now a part of the municipality of Lenningen. Near this village, there are a total of six karst wells.  The sources, the narrow valley and the village are a popular hiking destination.  The sources are part of a nature reserve.  The two most important wells in terms of volume, are the Lauterquelle and the Goldloch.

Lauterquelle 
The Lauterquelle, or Lauter Well, is  ahead of the Lauter Mill, where the water-impermeable valley floor emerges. This source is so strong and rich that it could drive an overshot mill, the Lauter Mill.

Goldloch 
The Goldloch, or Golden Hole, is only periodically active. The mouth of the cave was extended to its present size by miners in 1824–25. No gold was found.

Trout 
Trout are bred in the clean, oxygen-rich karst spring water.  Water from all six wells flows into fish ponds on the eastern edge of the village of Schlattstall.

Tributaries 
 Seltenbach, on the left side

References

External links

 Sources of Black Lauter (in German)
 The Swabian Alb and its nature: Wells: Golden Hole. Retrieved on 29 May 2010 (in German)

Rivers of Baden-Württemberg
Rivers of Germany